Granbergsdal Ironworks is an ironworks, blast furnace, in Granbergsdal, a village in Karlskoga Municipality in Sweden. The ironworks is a listed building (since 1982), thus enjoying cultural and historical protection.

Granbergsdal Ironworks was established in 1642 by Mårten Eriksson, following a surge in the demand for iron during the Thirty Years' War.

References

Further reading 

 

Buildings and structures in Karlskoga Municipality
Ironworks in Sweden
Industry museums in Sweden
1642 establishments in Sweden
Museums in Örebro County